= ODCI =

ODCI may refer to:

- Office of the Director of Central Intelligence, a historical post (1946–2005) in the United States of America
- Oracle Data Cartridge Interface, a component of Oracle Database
